Moses Minas Housepian (Armenian: , 1876 – December 11, 1952) was a Syrian-born Armenian-American physician and humanitarian aid worker.

Biography 
Moses Minas Housepian was born in 1876 in Kessab, Cilicia, Ottoman Empire (now Syria). He escaped the Hamidian massacres in his youth. He graduated from Long Island College Hospital (LICH) in 1905. 

He later headed a humanitarian medical mission in Russian Armenia from 1916–1918 treating refugees from the Armenian genocide. He is credited with stopping the spread of a typhus epidemic and was known as the "Angel of Mercy", and as "Dr. Purgich" (English: "Dr. Saviour"). 

Housepian was active in the Armenian Democratic Liberal Party, whose chapter in New York City was posthumously named for him. His wife, Makrouhie Housepian (née Ashjian), was active in the Armenian General Benevolent Union and other Armenian causes. Moses and Makrouhie Housepian were the parents of Marjorie Housepian Dobkin and Edgar Housepian.

Housepian died on December 11, 1952 in New York City.

References 

People of the Armenian genocide
American people of Armenian descent
Armenian physicians
Armenians from the Ottoman Empire
People from Kessab
1876 births
1952 deaths
Emigrants from the Ottoman Empire to the United States